Biodiversity in Israel and Palestine is about the fauna and flora in the geographical region of Israel and of the State of Palestine (the West Bank and the and Gaza Strip). This geographical area within the historical region of Palestine extends from the Jordan River and Wadi Araba in the east, to the Mediterranean Sea and the Sinai desert in the west, to Lebanon in the north, and to the gulf of Aqaba, or Eilat in the south.

The area is part of the Palearctic realm, located in the Mediterranean Basin, whose climate supports the Mediterranean forests, woodlands, and scrub biome. This includes the Eastern Mediterranean conifer-sclerophyllous-broadleaf forests and the Southern Anatolian montane conifer and deciduous forests ecoregions.

There are five different geographical zones and the climate varies from semi-arid to temperate to subtropical. The region is home to a variety of plants and animals; at least 47,000 living species have been identified, with another 4,000 assumed to exist. 116 species of mammals are native to  Palestine/Israel, as well as 511 bird species, 97 reptile species, and seven amphibian species. There are also an estimated 2,780 plant species.

Geography

The region of Palestine with the Gaza Strip, Israel, and the West Bank are located at the eastern end of the Mediterranean Sea, traditionally called the Levant. Israel is bounded on the north by Lebanon and on the northeast by Syria. Jordan lies to the east and southeast of the West Bank and Israel; Israel and the Gaza Strip are bordered on the southwest by the Egyptian Sinai Peninsula and on the west by the Mediterranean Sea.

Climate
The region is divided into three major climate zones, and one microclimate zone:

The Mediterranean climate zone, characterized by long, hot, rainless summers and relatively short, cool, rainy winters. The rainfall may go from as much as 400mm for a year (in the south around Gaza), to 1,200mm for a year (in the northernmost end of Israel). The Mediterranean landscapes include several kinds of forest, garrigue, scrubland, marsh and savanna-like-grassland. The fauna and flora are mostly of European origin.
The Steppe climate zone. It is a narrow strip (no wider than 60 km, and mostly, much narrower) between the Mediterranean zone and the Desert zone. The rainfall varies from 400mm for year to 200mm for year. This climate zone includes mostly low-grasslands and hardy forms of scrub. The fauna and flora are mostly of Asian and Saharan origin.
The Desert climate zone, which is the largest climate zone of Israel and Palestine, covers the country's southern half as the Negev, while the Judean Desert extends to the Dead Sea region through the West Bank and into the southern Jordan Valley. Rainfall is as low as 32mm per year in the southernmost tip of Palestine/Israel in the Arabah valley. This dry climate zone grows scattered shrub vegetation or desert-grassland in its wetter parts. In the more arid regions, the vegetation is confined to dry riverbeds and gullies, known as wadis and in some places it is almost absent. In some of the greater valleys, desert-scrub and acacia-woodland are to be found. The fauna and flora are mostly of Saharan origin. Sudanese flora is present as well.
The Tropical (Sudanese) Microclimate by the springs of the Judean Desert. Refers mostly to Ein Gedi spring and Arugot creek. Due to the high aquifer in the region, and the steady, hot climate of the Judean desert, a tropical savanna-related flora (not rainforest, as many think) of East-African origin has established in the area of the springs. The fauna is that of the Desert zone.

The climate is determined by the location between the subtropical aridity of the Sahara and the Arabian deserts, and the subtropical humidity of the Levant or eastern Mediterranean. The climate conditions are highly variable within the area and modified locally by altitude, latitude, and the proximity to the Mediterranean sea.

Taxonomification

The following is a taxonomical classification up to Phylum level of all species found in the area.

Regnum Protista
Regnum Fungi
Plyla:Ascomycota - Basidiomycota - Glomeromycota - Myxomycota - Zygomycota - Chytridiomycota - Anamorphic fungi
Regnum Plantae
Phyla: Anthocerophyta - Bryophyta - Charophyta - Chlorophyta - Cycadophyta - Equisetophyta - Ginkgophyta - Gnetophyta - Hepatophyta - Lycopodiophyta - Magnoliophyta - Ophioglossophyta - Pinophyta - Psilotophyta - Pteridophyta
Regnum Animalia
Subregnum: Parazoa
Phylum: Porifera
Subregnum: Agnotozoa
Phyla: Orthonectida - Placozoa - Rhombozoa
Subregnum: Eumetazoa
Superphylum: Radiata
Phyla: Cnidaria - Ctenophora
Bilateria: Protostomia
Phyla: Acanthocephala - Annelida - Arthropoda - Brachiopoda - Bryozoa - Chaetognatha - Cycliophora - Echiura - Entoprocta - Gastrotricha - Gnathostomulida - Kinorhyncha - Loricifera - Micrognathozoa - Mollusca - Myzostomida - Nematoda - Nematomorpha - Nemertea - Onychophora - Phoronida - Platyhelminthes - Priapula - Rotifera - Sipuncula - Tardigrada
Bilateria: Deuterostomia
Phyla: Echinodermata - Hemichordata - Chordata - Xenoturbellida

Online databases
The following are online well prepared databases about the biodiversity in the Palestine Israel area.

Flora of Israel Online, The Hebrew University, Jerusalem 
BioGIS: Israel Biodiversity Information System 
Botanical Garden University E Book 
Biodiversity of Jordan and Israel

Articles
Bird Species in Israel

Societies
Palestine Wildlife Society 
Israel Nature and National Parks Protection Authority

Bird watching
Birding Israel: the world of birds, birding tours and birdwatching in Israel 
International Center for the Study of Bird Migration 
The Israeli Center for Yardbirds 
The Jerusalem Bird Observatory

Photographers
Rittner Oz. Amazing collection of great images of small creatures in the area with fine scientific classification. 
Ilia Shalamaev: Excellent photographs of wildlife in the area. 
Vadim Onishchenko 
The Edge , A searchable collection of nature photos. Search for Palestine, Israel in the database. Site created by Niall Benvie

Neighbouring countries
The Arabian Oryx Website 

Biologists
Nature conservation projects
Natural reserves

Selected images

Environment of the State of Palestine
Environment of Israel
Environment of Palestine (region)
Natural history of Israel
Biodiversity
ar:الحياة البرية في الشام